The 2002 All-Big Ten Conference football team consists of American football players chosen as All-Big Ten Conference players for the 2002 NCAA Division I-A football season.  The conference recognizes two official All-Big Ten selectors: (1) the Big Ten conference coaches selected separate offensive and defensive units and named first- and second-team players (the "Coaches" team); and (2) a panel of sports writers and broadcasters covering the Big Ten also selected offensive and defensive units and named first- and second-team players (the "Media" team).

Offensive selections

Quarterbacks
 Brad Banks, Iowa (Coaches-1; Media-1)
 Craig Krenzel, Ohio State (Coaches-2; Media-2)

Running backs
 Larry Johnson, Penn State (Coaches-1; Media-1)
 Fred Russell, Iowa (Coaches-1; Media-2)
 Maurice Clarett, Ohio State (Coaches-2; Media-1)
 Anthony Davis, Wisconsin (Coaches-2; Media-2)

Receivers
 Charles Rogers, Michigan State (Coaches-1; Media-1)
 Bryant Johnson, Penn State (Coaches-1)
 John Standeford, Purdue (Media-1)
 Michael Jenkins, Ohio State (Coaches-2; Media-2)
 Braylon Edwards, Michigan (Coaches-2)
 Brandon Lloyd, Illinois (Media-2)

Centers
 Bruce Nelson, Iowa (Coaches-1; Media-1)
 Al Johnson, Wisconsin (Coaches-2; Media-2)

Guards
 David Baas, Michigan (Coaches-1; Media-1)
 Eric Steinbach, Iowa (Coaches-1; Media-1)
 David Diehl, Illinois (Coaches-2; Media-2)
 Jeff Roehl, Northwestern (Coaches-2; Media-2)

Tackles
 Robert Gallery, Iowa (Coaches-1; Media-1)
 Tony Pashos, Illinois (Coaches-2; Media-1)
 Tony Pape, Michigan (Coaches-1)
 Shane Olivea, Ohio State (Coaches-2; Media-2)
 David Porter, Iowa (Media-2)

Tight ends
 Dallas Clark, Iowa (Coaches-1; Media-1)	
 Bennie Joppru, Michigan (Coaches-2; Media-2)

Defensive selections

Defensive linemen
 Colin Cole, Iowa (Coaches-1; Media-1)
 Michael Haynes, Penn State (Coaches-1; Media-1)
 Jimmy Kennedy, Penn State (Coaches-1; Media-1)
 Darrion Scott, Ohio State (Coaches-1; Media-2)
 Howard Hodges, Iowa (Coaches-2; Media-1)
 Will Smith, Ohio State (Coaches-2; Media-2)
 Tim Anderson, Ohio State (Coaches-2)
 Kenny Peterson, Ohio State (Coaches-2)
 Dan Rumishek, Michigan (Media-2)
 Derrick Strong, Illinois (Media-2)

Linebackers
 Victor Hobson, Michigan (Coaches-1; Media-1)
 Matt Wilhelm, Ohio State (Coaches-1; Media-1)
 Fred Barr, Iowa (Coaches-1; Media-2)
 Niko Koutouvides, Purdue (Coaches-2; Media-1)
 Grant Steen, Iowa (Coaches-2)
 Cie Grant, Ohio State (Coaches-2)
 Jerry Schumacher, Illinois (Media-2)
 Gino Capone, Penn State (Media-2)

Defensive backs
 Mike Doss, Ohio State (Coaches-1; Media-1)
 Marlin Jackson, Michigan (Coaches-1; Media-1)
 Bob Sanders, Iowa (Coaches-1; Media-1)
 Chris Gamble, Ohio State (Coaches-1; Media-2)
 Jim Leonhard, Wisconsin (Coaches-2; Media-1)
 Eugene Wilson, Illinois (Coaches-2; Media-2)
 Shawn Mayer, Penn State (Coaches-2; Media-2)
 Derek Pagel, Iowa (Coaches-2)
 Stuart Schweigert, Purdue (Media-2)

Special teams

Kickers
 Nate Kaeding, Iowa (Coaches-1; Media-2)
 Mike Nugent, Ohio State (Coaches-2; Media-1)

Punters
 Andy Groom, Ohio State (Coaches-1; Media-1)
 Adam Finley, Michigan (Coaches-2; Media-2)

Key
Bold = selected as a first-team player by both the coaches and media panel

Coaches = selected by Big Ten Conference coaches

Media = selected by a media panel

HM = Honorable mention

See also
 2002 College Football All-America Team

References

All-Big Ten Conference
All-Big Ten Conference football teams